"Take a Look Around" is a song by American rap rock band Limp Bizkit. It is the first single and tenth track on their third album, Chocolate Starfish and the Hot Dog Flavored Water, and was released on July 3, 2000. The main riff of the song is derived from the original Mission: Impossible theme composed by Lalo Schifrin, however it deviates in its meter which is common time, except the bridge, which uses Schifrin's original  time signature. It appears on the soundtrack to the 2000 film Mission: Impossible 2. In the United Kingdom, "Take a Look Around" was Limp Bizkit's first single release.

The song became a European hit in mid-2000, reaching number one in Iceland and Portugal, number two in Finland and Spain, and number three in Italy and the UK. In addition to reaching the top 10 in several other European countries, it became a top-30 hit in Australia and New Zealand. The song received a Grammy nomination for Best Hard Rock Performance in 2001 but lost to Rage Against the Machine's "Guerrilla Radio". An instrumental version of "Take a Look Around" was released as a promo and later included as a B-side on some versions of the "Rollin'" single.

Music video
The video for the song features the band working undercover at a coffee shop in order to retrieve a disc from a group of secret agents. But just as they are about to succeed, they are ordered to abort the mission, as the secret agents turn out to be decoys. The boys are soon kicked out, and the phone that Fred Durst uses at the beginning blows up right at the end. There are also scenes of the band performing in front of the coffee shop as well as brief shots from Mission: Impossible 2. At the beginning of the video, the song "Break Stuff" can be heard in the car that the band arrives in.

The video was rarely shown in the States. Fred Durst has stated that he dislikes the video – despite the fact that he directed it – and the band decided to release the video only in various markets outside the U.S., particularly Europe. It is not available on either the DVD of Mission: Impossible 2, or the band's DVD compilation Greatest Videoz.

Reception
In 2022, Louder Sound and Kerrang ranked the song number six and number four, respectively, on their lists of Limp Bizkit's greatest songs.

Track listings

UK CD1
 "Take a Look Around (Theme from MI:2)" (album version) – 5:36
 "Faith" (George Michael cover) – 3:52
 "Break Stuff" (CD-ROM video)

UK CD 2
 "Take a Look Around (Theme from MI:2)" (radio edit) – 4:26
 "N 2 Gether Now" (live) – 6:37
 "N 2 Gether Now" (CD-ROM video)

UK cassette single
 "Take a Look Around (Theme from MI:2)" (radio edit) – 4:24
 "Take a Look Around (Theme from MI:2)" (album version) – 5:36

European CD single
 "Take a Look Around (Theme from MI:2)" (album version) – 5:36
 "Break Stuff" (live) – 4:03

European 7-inch single
A. "Take a Look Around (Theme from MI:2)" (album version)
B. "Faith" (George Michael cover)

Australian CD single
 "Take a Look Around (Theme from MI:2)" (radio edit)
 "N 2 Gether Now" (live) – 6:37
 "Nookie"
 "N 2 Gether Now" (CD-ROM video)

Charts

Weekly charts

Year-end charts

Certifications

Notes

References

2000 singles
2000 songs
Compositions by Lalo Schifrin
Limp Bizkit songs
Mission: Impossible (film series)
Mission: Impossible music
Music videos directed by Fred Durst
Number-one singles in Iceland
Number-one singles in Portugal
Songs written by Fred Durst